Enrofloxacin (ENR) is a fluoroquinolone antibiotic sold by the Bayer Corporation under the trade name Baytril. It is sold by in a generic form by Bimeda Inc. under the name EnroMed 100. Enrofloxacin is currently approved by the FDA for the treatment of individual pets and domestic animals in the United States. In September 2005, the FDA withdrew approval of Baytril for use in water to treat flocks of poultry, as this practice was noted to promote the evolution of fluoroquinolone-resistant strains of the bacterium Campylobacter, a human pathogen.

It is a bactericidal agent. The bactericidal activity of enrofloxacin is concentration-dependent, with susceptible bacteria cell death occurring within 20–30 minutes of exposure. Enrofloxacin has demonstrated a significant post-antibiotic effect for both Gram-negative  and Gram-positive bacteria and is active in both stationary and growth phases of bacterial replication. Enrofloxacin is partially deethylated by CYP450 into the active metabolite ciprofloxacin, which is also a fluoroquinolone antibiotic.

While widely used in veterinary medicine, enrofloxacin has hallucinogenic effects that prohibit use in humans.

Activity and susceptibility data
Enrofloxacin is a synthetic antibacterial agent from the class of the fluoroquinolone carboxylic acid derivatives. It has antibacterial activity against a broad spectrum of Gram-negative and Gram-positive bacteria. It is effective against:
 Pseudomonas aeruginosa
 Klebsiella
 Escherichia coli
 Enterobacter
 Campylobacter
 Shigella
 Salmonella
 Aeromonas
 Haemophilus
 Proteus
 Yersinia
 Serratia
 Vibrio
 Brucella
 Chlamydia trachomatis
 Staphylococcus (including penicillinase-producing and methicillin-resistant strains)
 Mycoplasma
 Mycobacterium

Variable activity against:
 Streptococcus

Ineffective against:
 Anaerobes

The following data represent minimum inhibitory concentration ranges for a few medically significant bacterial pathogens:
 Escherichia coli - 0.022 - 0.03 µg/ml
 Staphylococcus aureus - 0.0925 - 64 µg/ml
 Pseudomonas aeruginosa - 0.05 µg/ml

Adverse effects/warnings

Enrofloxacin was banned for poultry use in the United States in 2005.

Overdosage/acute toxicity
It is unlikely that an acute overdose of either compound would result in symptoms more serious than either anorexia or vomiting, but the adverse effects noted above could occur. Dogs receiving 10 times the labeled dosage rate of enrofloxacin for at least 14 days developed only vomiting and anorexia. Death did occur in some dogs when fed 25 times the labeled rate for 11 days, however.
 Oral : greater than 5000 mg/kg
 Dermal LD50: greater than 2000 mg/kg
 Inhalation LD50: greater than 3547 mg/m3 (4-hour exposure)
 Eye effects: irritant; reversible in less than 7 days.  In cats, it can produce sudden onset blindness when administered by injection, as it is retinotoxic.

Degradation
The brown rot fungus Gloeophyllum striatum can degrade the fluoroquinolone enrofloxacin using hydroxyl radicals.

References 
Acta Crystallogr. (2014). E70,  o200-o201

https://doi.org/10.1107/S1600536814001421

Enrofloxacinium oxalate 
T. S.  Yamuna, M.  Kaur, B. J.  Anderson, J. P.  Jasinski and H. S.  Yathirajan

Fluoroquinolone antibiotics
Veterinary drugs
Piperazines
Cyclopropanes
Carboxylic acids